Corypha taliera is a species of palm, originally native to Myanmar (Burma) and the Bengal region of India and Bangladesh. It was first discovered by Scottish botanist William Roxburgh. It has been listed extinct in the wild in the IUCN Red list. The species is locally known as Tali Palm or Talipalm.

Taxonomy 

A solitary, massive, moderately slow growing, monoecious palm with a hapaxanthic or monocarpic mode of growth where the plant dies after setting seed. These are one of the largest palmate leaves of any plant. These, together with C. umbraculifera's hold the record of the largest palmate leaves of any plant. The main identification characteristic of C. taliera is that the tree has no persistent leaf-bases when young, unlike other Corypha species which hold huge rhino horn shaped leaf-bases for many years before shedding them to reveal a rough grey trunk.

History

There are now no more of this nearly extinct species, 

The plant was discovered in the 1950s growing in the scrub jungle and was identified as a member of the genus Corypha by university professor M. Salar Khan. It was then identified as a tali palm tree by Indian scientist Shamal Kumar Basu, when he was on a visit to Dhaka in 2001. It was subsequently protected in what later became the enclosure of the residential quarters of the Pro-Vice-Chancellor.

On October 18, 2008, Daily Prothom Alo reported that the plant was about to bloom. According to botanists, the plant would die soon after it blooms. It flowered in 2010 and died in 2012.

On October 22, 2008, Daily Naya Diganta and Daily Jaijaidin reported that there were a few more plants still remaining at Edward Park, Bogra. In January 2010, the 30-foot tree flowered.

On October 5, 2015, Daily Prothom Alo reported that about 300 plants were grown from the seed from the plant that bloomed in 2008 in Dhaka University. According to the news, tissue culture was not successful, but University's gardener Jahangir Alam sowed the seeds and became successful. Seedlings were distributed to other universities in Bangladesh, namely Dhaka University, Rajshahi University and Comilla University and to the Department of Forestry.

The last known member of this species, except for the one at Dhaka University, was in the district of Birbhum in West Bengal. It was cut down, despite protests by local scientist Shamal Kumar Basu, by the locals who thought it to be a 'ghost palm tree' when it bloomed in 1979. This superstition was caused by the signature 'horns' grown by the tree prior to blooming. However, Shamal Kumar Basu later identified the tree at Dhaka University as a tali palm tree in 2001.

Goutam Roy, Headmaster of Rampurhat Chatra High School, was able to acquire five plants from Dhaka University and plant them in the Visva-Bharati University campus.

References

taliera
Flora of India (region)
Trees of Myanmar
Trees of Bangladesh
Plants extinct in the wild
Plants described in 1820